The Tinbergen Lecture is an academic prize lecture awarded by the Association for the Study of Animal Behaviour (ASAB).

Lecturers 
1974 W.H. Thorpe
1975 G.P. Baerends
1976 J. Maynard Smith
1977 F. Huber
1978 R.A. Hinde
1979 J. Bowlby
1980 W.D. Hamilton
1981 S.J. Gould
1982 H. Kummer
1983 Jörg-Peter Ewert
1984 Frank A. Beach
1985 Peter Marler
1986 Jürgen Aschoff
1987 Aubrey Manning
1988 Stephen T. Emlen
1989 P.P.G. Bateson
1990 J.D. Delius
1991 John R. Krebs
1992 E. Curio
1993 Linda Partridge
1994 Fernando Nottebohm
1995 G.A. Parker
1996 Serge Daan
1997 N.B. Davies
1998 Michael Land
1999 Bert Hölldobler
2000 Richard Dawkins
2001 Felicity Huntingford
2002 Marian Dawkins
2003 Tim Clutton-Brock
2004 Tim Birkhead
2005 P.K. McGregor
2006 Pat Monaghan
2007 M. Kirkpatrick
2008 Peter Slater
2009 
2010 Laurent Keller
2011 Cancelled
2012 A Cockburn
2013 Marlene Zuk
2014 Innes Cuthill
2015 Nina Wedell
2016 Alex Kacelnik
2017 Christine Nicol
2018 Bart Kempenaers
2019 Rebecca Kilner
2020 Lars Chittka

References 

British lecture series